The Curonian language, or Old Curonian, was a nearly unattested Baltic language spoken by the Curonians, a Baltic tribe who inhabited the Courland Peninsula (now western Latvia) and the nearby Baltic shore.

Classification
Curonian was an Indo-European language of the Baltic branch. This was proven by Jānis Endzelīns that Curonian was a Baltic language.

Curonian's relation to other Baltic languages is unclear:
Some scholars consider it to have been an Eastern Baltic language, intermediate between Lithuanian and Latvian.
 Others, like Vytautas Mažiulis, classify it as a Western Baltic language that became closer to the Eastern branch due to extensive contact.
 Linguist Eduard Vääri argues that it is possible that Curonians were Baltic Finns.

History 
Old Curonian disappeared in the course of the 16th century.

After the dissolution of the Soviet Union, the Baltic states saw a revival of scientific and cultural interest in extinct Baltic languages and tribes, including Yotvingian, Curonian, and Old Prussian.

Lexicon

Corpus

Evidence from other languages
Curonian left substrata in western dialects of the Latvian and Lithuanian, namely the Samogitian dialect. No written documents in this language are known, but some ancient Lithuanian texts from western regions show some Curonian influence. According to Lithuanian linguist Zigmas Zinkevičius, long and intense Curonian–Lithuanian bilingualism existed.

Onomastics
There are only few onomastics in the region considered to have been inhabited by the Curonians.

Potential text in Curonian
Additionally, the Pater Noster reported by Simon Grunau is speculated to be in Curonian.

Lord's Prayer after Simon Grunau

See also
Kursenieki language

References

Literature
Ambrassat, August "Die Provinz Ostpreußen", Frankfurt/ Main 1912
Endzelin, J.: Über die Nationalität und Sprache der Kuren, in Finnisch-Ungarische Forschungen, XII, 1912
Gaerte, Wilhelm "Urgeschichte Ostpreussens", Königsberg 1929
Gimbutas, Marija "Die Balten", München-Berlin 1983
Kurschat, Heinrich A.: Das Buch vom Memelland, Siebert Oldenburg 1968
Kwauka, Paul, Pietsch, Richard: Kurisches Wörterbuch, Verlag Ulrich Camen Berlin, 1977, 
Kwauka, Paul: Namen des Memellandes/ Unsere „fremdartigen“ Familiennamen, Archiv AdM, Oldenburg
Lepa, Gerhard (Hrsg) "Die Schalauer", Tolkemita-Texte Dieburg 1997
Mortensen, Hans und Gertrud "Die Besiedlung des nordöstlichen Ostpreußens bis zum Beginn des 17. Jahrhunderts", Leipzig 1938
Mortensen, Hans und Gertrud: Kants väterliche Ahnen und ihre Umwelt, Rede von 1952 in Jahrbuch der Albertus-Universität zu Königsberg / Pr., Holzner- Verlag Kitzingen/ Main 1953 Bd. 3
Peteraitis, Vilius: Mažoji Lietuva ir Tvanksta (Lithuania Minor and Tvanksta) Vilnius 1992
Pietsch, Richard (künstlerischer Entwurf und Text): Bildkarte rund um das Kurische Haff, Heimat-Buchdienst Georg Banszerus, Höxter, Herstellung: Neue Stalling, Oldenburg
Pietsch, Richard: Deutsch-Kurisches Wörterbuch, Verlag Nordostdeutsches Kulturwerk Lüneburg 1991, 
Pietsch, Richard: Fischerleben auf der Kurischen Nehrung dargestellt in kurischer und deutscher Sprache, Verlag Ulrich Camen Berlin 1982
Schmid, Wolfgang P. (Hrg): Nehrungskurisch, Sprachhistorische und instrumentalphonetische Studien zu einem aussterbenden Dialekt, Stuttgart 1989
Schmid, Wolfgang P.: Das Nehrungskurische, ein sprachhistorischer Überblick
Tolksdorf, Ulrich "Fischerei und Fischerkultur in Ostpreußen", Heide/ Holstein 1991
Žadeikiene, Daiva, Krajinskas, Albertas: Kurenkahnwimpel,

External links
 Pietsch-Bildkarte „Kurisches Haff“ 
 Der Kurenwimpel 
 Curonians in Memelland 
 Curonian placenames in Memelland 
 Studentu zinātniskās konferences "Aktuāli baltistikas jautājumi" tēzes Loreta Stonkutė. Kuršininkų tarmės lituanizmai. p.43, 44

Baltic languages
West Baltic languages
Extinct Baltic languages
Extinct languages of Europe
Medieval languages
Languages extinct in the 16th century
16th-century disestablishments in Europe